Toni Jordan (born 1966 in Sydney, Australia) is a Melbourne-based novelist best known for her debut novel Addition, an international bestseller long listed for the Miles Franklin Award.  In 2017 her second book, Our Tiny Useless Hearts was shortlisted for the Voss Literary Prize. Her novel Nine Days was named the Indie Book of the Year by the Australian Booksellers in 2013. She currently teaches at the Faber Academy.

Bibliography

Novels 
 Addition (2008) 
 Fall Girl (2011) 
 Nine Days (2013) 
 Our Tiny Useless Hearts (2016) 
 The Fragments (2018) 
 Dinner with the Schabels (2022)

References

External links 
 Author's official site
 Text Publishing's author page
 Good Reads author page
 Interview with the Sydney Morning Herald
 Interview with Nick Earls on ABC's The Green Room

Living people
21st-century Australian novelists
21st-century Australian women writers
Writers from Sydney
1966 births
Australian women novelists